USS Diomedes (ARB-11) was an  built for the United States Navy during World War II. Named for Diomedes (in Greek mythology, a prince of Argos, one of the bravest heroes of the Trojan War), she was the only U.S. Naval vessel to bear the name.

LST-1119 was launched on 11 January 1945 by the Chicago Bridge and Iron Company of Seneca, Illinois; sponsored by Mrs. M. D. Hembree; placed in partial commission from 23 January to 21 February 1945 for the passage to Baltimore, Maryland; converted to a battle damage repair ship as USS Diomedes (ARB-11); and commissioned on 23 June 1945.

Service history
Diomedes arrived at Okinawa on 25 September, and on 3 October got underway for Hong Kong to provide repair services. She sailed from Hong Kong on 8 December and called at Kiirun, Formosa before arriving at Taku, China on 19 December to continue her repair work. Departing Taku on 20 March 1946 Diomedes called at Pearl Harbor, and arrived at Charleston, South Carolina on 28 May. She arrived in Jacksonville, Florida on 2 June, and was placed out of commission in reserve there on 3 December 1946.

Diomedes was transferred on 7 June 1961 to West Germany, whereupon she was renamed Wotan (A513). Her final fate is unknown.

References
 
 

 

Aristaeus-class repair ships
Aristaeus-class repair ships converted from LST-542-class ships
Ships built in Seneca, Illinois
1945 ships
World War II auxiliary ships of the United States
Aristaeus-class repair ships of the German Navy
Cold War auxiliary ships of Germany